The 1984 San Luis Obispo mid-air collision was an accident involving a Beechcraft C-99 Commuter and a Rockwell Commander 112 near San Luis Obispo, California, United States on 24 August 1984. None of the combined 17 passengers and crew on either aircraft survived the accident.

Accident 
Wings West Airlines Flight 628 was on a scheduled flight from Los Angeles, United States to San Francisco, United States with scheduled stops at Santa Maria, United States and San Luis Obispo, United States, where the aircraft picked up six and seven passengers respectively. The aircraft was flown by Captain Paul Nebolon (aged 27), who had 4,110 total flying hours including 873 hours on the Beechcraft, and co-pilot Deverl Johnson (aged 45) who had acquired 6,194 total flight hours including 62 hours on the Beechcraft. Flight 628 left the gate at San Luis Obispo-County Airport at 11.10 am, and took off from runway 29 six minutes later, bound for San Francisco. Weather at the time was clear, with a visibility of 15 miles (24.14 km).

Around the same time, a single-engined Rockwell Commander 112 which had a student and instructor onboard on an instrument training flight, had taken off from the same airport as Flight 628 at 10.55 am without a flight plan, and was now returning to the airport. At the time, both planes were flying through visual means instead of the usual IFR.

The commander had nearly been sheered in half by the collision, while Flight 628 spiraled mostly intact towards the ground. Ultimately crashing North of the airport in a hilly and Rural area off Highway 1, scattering flaming wreckage which ignited a 20 acre brush fire that was quickly contained. Emergency services, including a helicopter, arrived on the scene and recovered the remains of the occupants from both planes. All 17 people on both aircraft had perished. The badly mangled bodies were brought to local mortuaries that evening, where an FBI disaster team would attempt to indentify the remains. The crash was the first accident for Wings West Airlines, since their founding in 1979.

Aircraft 
The Beechcraft C-99 Commuter involved, N6399U (msn U-187) was built in 1982 and in service of Wings West Airlines at the time of the accident. The Rockwell Commander 112 involved, N112SM was owned by the Aesthetech Corporation (A flight school) at the time of the accident.

Aftermath 
The wreckage of both aircraft were completely destroyed in the accident and post-crash fire. An investigation into the accident concluded that the cause lay with the pilots of both aircraft for flying under Visual flight rules as opposed to Instrument flight rules, which would have alerted the Air traffic controllers of the imminent collision and could have therefore warned the planes to take evasive action. A radio frequency that both planes transmitted, could've also prevented the accident. However Flight 628's pilots only monitered the frequency for the first 5 miles (8 km) of the journey before turning their attention back to the flight. This proved to be too short to pick up the transmission from the approaching Commander. Because neither aircraft were flying under Instrument flight rules, no air traffic controllers had their attention turned towards the two airplanes. Despite the clear skies and the head-on direction both planes were flying at, the Beechcraft would have only noticed the Commander about 10 seconds before the collision, while the commander would've only seen the Beechcraft about 6 to 8 seconds before the collision. Investigators with the NTSB concluded that the timeframe the pilots of both aircraft were given to avoid each other after they had spotted oneanother, wasn't enough to avoid the collision.

References 

Mid-air collisions involving general aviation aircraft
Mid-air collisions
Aviation accidents and incidents caused by pilot error
1984 in the United States
1984 in California
August 1984 events in the United States
Aviation accidents and incidents in 1984
August 1984 events in North America
Aviation accidents and incidents in the United States in 1984
Accidents and incidents involving the Beechcraft Model 99
Aviation accidents and incidents in California